The 1963–64 Honduran Amateur League was the 16th edition of the Honduran Amateur League.  Club Deportivo Olimpia obtained its 5th national title.  The season ran from 1 March 1963 to 2 February 1964.

Regional champions

Known results

Second round
Played in two sub-groups of three teams each between the regional champions where the winners advanced to the Final.

Known results

Final
Played in a series of three games.

Olimpia's lineup

References

Liga Amateur de Honduras seasons
Honduras
1963 in Honduran sport
1964 in Honduran sport